Roger Tschudin (born 21 July 1966) is a retired Swiss football goalkeeper.

References

1966 births
Living people
Swiss men's footballers
FC Luzern players
SC Kriens players
Swiss Super League players
Association football goalkeepers
Switzerland under-21 international footballers